Chinese Rose may refer to:

 Hibiscus rosa-sinensis, a flowering plant of the genus Hibiscus
 Rosa chinensis, a flowering plant of the genus Rosa